Fame and Wealth is a 1983 album by Loudon Wainwright III. It was released on Rounder Records.
After a five-year hiatus since Final Exam, it eschewed the rock sound of his later 1970s albums in favour of a stripped-down, wirier folk sound which would typify his recorded output from then on.

Track listing
All tracks composed by Loudon Wainwright III

"Reader and Advisor"  – 5:28
"The Grammy Song"  – 2:41
"Dump the Dog"  – 2:08
"Thick & Thin"  – 2:47
"Revenge"  – 2:39
"Five Years Old"  – 3:19
"Ingenue"  – 3:40
"IDTTYWLM"  – 4:06
"Westchester County"  – 2:56
"Saturday Morning Fever"  – 2:17
"April Fool's Day Morn"  – 4:30
"Fame and Wealth"  – 1:31

Personnel
Loudon Wainwright III - acoustic guitar, banjo, drum, vocals
with:
Richard Thompson - acoustic guitar on "April Fool's Day Morn"; electric guitar, mandolin on "Reader and Advisor"
Myles Chase - synthesizer, piano, Fender Rhodes on "Five Years Old"
Mark Hardwick - piano on "IDTTYWLM"
Luther Rix - drums, percussion on "Five Years Old"
Bob Rose - 12-string guitar on "Five Years Old"
Mark Johnson - percussion on "IDTTYWLM"
John Miller - bass on "Five Years Old"
Technical
Michael Ewasko - engineer
Teddy Wainwright - executive producer
Keith Scott Morton - cover photography

Release history
LP: Rounder 3076 (U.S.)
LP: Demon FIEND5 (UK)
CD: Rounder CD3076 (1987)

References

External links
Rounder Records, catalogue website for Fame and Wealth

Loudon Wainwright III albums
1983 albums
Rounder Records albums